Endless Harmony Soundtrack is an anthology album of previously unheard material by The Beach Boys, originally released by Capitol Records in August 1998.  Named for Bruce Johnston's song on the 1980 album Keepin' the Summer Alive, it was designed as a tie-in with the band's biographical documentary of the same name.  The soundtrack was re-issued in March 2000 with some remixing and different artwork (European pressings retained the original mixes), while the original 1998 edition (with the orange/yellow cover) went out of print shortly thereafter.

Background
The Endless Harmony project was undertaken shortly after the death of founding member Carl Wilson, who died of lung cancer in February 1998. At this point, Brian Wilson decided that the band was officially finished and disassociated himself from any further group activity. At odds with Mike Love for continuing after Carl's passing, Al Jardine did the same. Both Love and Bruce Johnston (with their accompanying concert act) continued to perform live as The Beach Boys until all five surviving members reunited for their 50th anniversary in 2012.

The Endless Harmony Soundtrack itself is patterned like The Beatles' Anthology albums, with alternate versions and live renditions of songs, as well as previously unreleased ones. Spanning from a stereo remix of 1963's "Surfer Girl" to the completion of the unreleased 1969 recording "Loop de Loop (Flip Flop Flyin' in an Aeroplane)", the album also includes a brief snippet of both Brian Wilson and Van Dyke Parks routining three Smile songs in 1966.

Endless Harmony Soundtrack never charted in the U.S. or the UK. Although the album was not a commercial success, it did encourage Capitol Records to issue a more comprehensive archival package in Hawthorne, CA, released in May 2001.

Track listing
All tracks written by Brian Wilson and Mike Love, unless otherwise noted.

"Soulful Old Man Sunshine" (Writing session excerpt) (Brian Wilson, Rick Henn) – 0:42
"Soulful Old Man Sunshine" (B. Wilson, Henn) – 3:25
"Radio Concert Promo 1" – 0:15
 The version on later pressings and the revised 2000 edition features a different promo from Dennis Wilson, which matches the one mentioned in the booklet.
"Medley: Surfin' Safari/Fun, Fun, Fun/Shut Down/Little Deuce Coupe/Surfin' U.S.A." (Live) (B. Wilson, Mike Love, Roger Christian, Chuck Berry) – 3:33
 Recorded on 22 October 1966 in Michigan
"Surfer Girl" (Binaural mix) (B. Wilson) – 2:27
 The version on the revised 2000 edition of the album is more of an a cappella mix
"Help Me, Rhonda" (Alternate single version) – 2:50
"Kiss Me, Baby" (Stereo remix) – 2:42
 The version on the revised 2000 edition is a redone mix by Mark Linett, as opposed to Andrew Sandoval.
"California Girls" (Stereo remix) – 2:44
 The version on the 1998 edition, also redone by Mark Linett features slightly out-of-sync vocals. This specific "updated stereo mix" has since appeared on most Beach Boys compilations issued since 2001.
"Good Vibrations" (Live) – 3:40
 Recorded in rehearsal on 8 December 1968 in London, England
"Heroes and Villains" (Demo) (B. Wilson, Van Dyke Parks) – 2:27
Recorded on 4 November 1966, this run through for Los Angeles DJ "Humble" Harve features, in addition to "Heroes and Villains", the fragments "I'm in Great Shape" and "Barnyard"
"Heroes and Villains" (Live) (B. Wilson, Parks) – 3:40
 Outtake from the 1973 live album The Beach Boys in Concert
"God Only Knows" (Live) (B. Wilson, Tony Asher) – 2:45
 Actually a live-in-the-studio recording in September 1967
"Radio Concert Promo 2" – 0:15
"Darlin'" (Live) – 2:26
 Recorded on 21 June 1980 at Knebworth, Hertfordshire, England
"Wonderful/Don't Worry Bill" (B. Wilson, Parks, Ricky Fataar, Blondie Chaplin, Steve Fataar, Brother Fataar) – 5:52
 A medley of Smile's "Wonderful" and a song released by The Flame (also known as "The Flames") called "Don't Worry Bill" recorded on 23 November 1972 at Carnegie Hall in New York City, New York
"Do It Again" (Early version) – 2:30
"Break Away" (Demo) (B. Wilson, Reggie Dunbar) – 2:38
 "Reggie Dunbar" is a pseudonym for Murry Wilson
"Sail Plane Song" (B. Wilson, Carl Wilson) – 2:12
"Loop de Loop (Flip Flop Flyin' in an Aeroplane)" (B. Wilson, C. Wilson, Al Jardine) – 2:56
 Recording begun in March 1969, finished by Al Jardine in July 1998
"Barbara" (Dennis Wilson) – 2:58
"'Til I Die" (Alternate mix) (B. Wilson) – 4:52
"Long Promised Road" (Live) (C. Wilson, Jack Rieley) – 4:17
 Recorded on 23 November 1972 at Carnegie Hall in New York City
"All Alone" (Carli Muñoz) – 3:36
"Brian's Back" (Love) – 4:07
 Written in response to Brian Wilson's 1976 return to the public eye"Endless Harmony" (Bruce Johnston) – 3:10
 The version on the revised 2000 edition features a hidden a cappella sample of "Kiss Me, Baby" after the song ends, extending the length to 3:29SourcesEndless Harmony Soundtrack'' CD booklet notes, Brad Elliott, c. 2000.
Allmusic

References

1998 compilation albums
The Beach Boys compilation albums
Capitol Records compilation albums
Compilation albums published posthumously